Gary Tan Lee Yu (born 21 April 1982) is a Singaporean former professional swimmer. He is currently the Singapore national team's swimming coach. He had previously held several national swimming records in Singapore.

Swimming career
On 18 June 2001 at the SEA Games Time Trials in the 200 Meters Backstroke he came in at 2:05.07 which is a record in Singapore.

On 7 December 2003 at the 22nd SEA Games in Hanoi, Vietnam, Gary won the Men 200 Meters Medley with the time of 2:05.94 which is a record in Singapore.

On 24 June 2005 at the 1st Singapore National Swimming Championship, he won the Men 200 Meters Butterfly with the time of 2:04.00 which is a record in Singapore.

Coaching 
Tan formerly worked at Swimfast Aquatic Club as a coach and also a director at Swimlab. He was also the head coach of the Phoenix Swim Team, which represents UWCSEA (United World College of South East Asia) Dover.

In 2011, Tan was suspended for a year for consideration for national coach accreditation after assisting a swimmer, Jeffrey Su, from Swimfast Aquatic Club to be absent without official leave when Su was supposed to be at Singapore Sports Council's physiotherapy and recovery sessions.

In 2014, he was named as assistant coach to the Singapore's national swimming team and appointed to be the national coach in 2016 after the former national coach, Sergio Lopez, left after the 2016 Summer Olympics at Rio de Janeiro.

He was named Coach of the Year at the 2018 Singapore Sports Awards, at that time the fourth year in a row that a swimming coach had taken the award.

Education 
Tan attended Brigham Young University where he was on the swim team.

References

External links
 

1982 births
Singaporean male backstroke swimmers
Singaporean male butterfly swimmers
Singaporean male medley swimmers
Singaporean sportspeople of Chinese descent
BYU Cougars men's swimmers
Anglo-Chinese School alumni
Living people
Swimmers at the 2002 Asian Games
Swimmers at the 2006 Asian Games
Swimmers at the 2004 Summer Olympics
Swimmers at the 2000 Summer Olympics
Southeast Asian Games medalists in swimming
Southeast Asian Games gold medalists for Singapore
Southeast Asian Games silver medalists for Singapore
Southeast Asian Games bronze medalists for Singapore
Competitors at the 2003 Southeast Asian Games
Asian Games competitors for Singapore
Olympic swimmers of Singapore